Cypraeerato is a genus of small sea snails, marine gastropod molluscs in the family Eratoidae.

Nomenclature
Under ICZN Art. 13.1, the name Cypraeerato is not available from Schilder (1932), who fixed a type species, but did not provide a description.

Species
Species within the genus Cypraeerato include :
 Cypraeerato bimaculata (Tate, 1878)
 Cypraeerato boucheti (Drivas & Jay, 1986)
 Cypraeerato geralia (C. N. Cate, 1977)
 Cypraeerato margarita Fehse, 2018
 Cypraeerato nitida Fehse, 2018
 Cypraeerato rangiroa Fehse, 2012
 Cypraeerato splendida Fehse, 2017
 Cypraeerato stalagmia (C. N. Cate, 1975)
Species brought into synonymy
 Cypraeerato gemma (Bavay, 1917): synonym of Eratoena gemma (Bavay, 1917)

References

 Cernohorsky, W. O. "Fossil and Recent Cypraeacea (Mollusca: Gastropoda) of New Zealand with descriptions of new species." Records of the Auckland Institute and Museum (1971): 103-129.
 Fehse, D. "Contributions to the knowledge of the Eratoidae. XIV. New Eratoids from Papua New Guinea including Kavieng, New Ireland." Neptunea 4 (2018).

External links
 Salvat, Bernard, and Jean Tröndlé. "Biogéographie des mollusques marins de Polynésie française." Revue d'écologie (2017).

Eratoidae
Gastropod genera